Terry Martin (born 25 May 1980) is an Australian former professional rugby league footballer who last played for the Crusaders in National League One. He had previously played for the Canberra Raiders in the NRL and has representative experience with the Australian Schoolboys side.

Background
Terry Martin was born in Canberra, Australian Capital Territory (ACT), Australia.

Playing career
While attending Erindale College, Martin played for the Australian Schoolboys team in 1998.

References

External links
Celtic Crusaders profile
Rugby League Project stats

1980 births
Living people
Australian rugby league players
Canberra Raiders players
Crusaders Rugby League players
Rugby league second-rows
Rugby league locks
Rugby league players from Canberra